Jill Cooper (née Nixon; born ) is an American politician who is a Republican member of the Pennsylvania House of Representatives, representing the 55th District since 2023.

Early life, education, and career
Born Jill Nixon in Allegheny County, Pennsylvania,  she grew up as one of four sisters in Plum, Pennsylvania. Nixon graduated from Plum High School in 1980 and earned a Bachelor of Science degree in management engineering from Grove City College in 1984.

Nixon worked for Alcoa for fourteen years, eventually becoming vice president of sales and overseas marketing at a subsidiary in Atlanta, Georgia.  She retired from Alcoa to raise her children.

Political career
In 2008, Cooper was elected to the Westmoreland County Republican Committee, chairing it from 2012 to 2014. She was later elected to the Pennsylvania Republican State Committee in 2014.

Cooper was a political organizer who participated in protests against lockdowns and business closures during the COVID-19 pandemic.

In 2022, Cooper unseated incumbent Pennsylvania State Representative Jason Silvis in the primary with 49% of the vote, in an election against Silvis and another primary contender. Cooper said she took the opportunity to run against Silvis, not because she opposed him, but because Silvis's district, the recently redrawn 55th District, had 75% new constituents and was an "open seat" in her mind. She was additionally "passion[ate]" to represent the district. She defeated Democrat Scott Gauss in the general election.

Personal life
Nixon met her husband, Leighton Cooper, in Atlanta, Georgia while she was working for Alcoa. The couple married in 1999 and moved to Murrysville, Pennsylvania, in 2005, where they currently reside with their two children.

Electoral history

References

Living people

1960s births
Republican Party members of the Pennsylvania House of Representatives
21st-century American politicians
People from Allegheny County, Pennsylvania
21st-century American women politicians
Year of birth uncertain